Plusha is a hamlet in Cornwall, England, UK. It is not far from Polyphant on the A30 main road at its junction with the B3257.

References

Hamlets in Cornwall